Albéric Pont (1870–1960) was a French dentist. He created a center for maxillofacial surgery during the first World War.

References

1870 births
1960 deaths
People from Bagnols-sur-Cèze
French dentists